Dragan Kokanović (born 1 May 2002) is a Serbian professional footballer who plays as a midfielder for Kabel on loan from Vojvodina.

References

External links
 
 

Living people
2002 births
Serbian footballers
Association football midfielders 
FK Vojvodina players
FK Kabel players
Serbian SuperLiga players